The Colour Field was the second release by the British new wave band, The Colourfield. This EP was released only in the US. The UK had already seen all of the songs released as either a single or a 12".

Track listing
All tracks written by Terry Hall and Toby Lyons

Personnel
The Colour Field
 Terry Hall - all instruments and voices
 Toby Lyons - all instruments and voices
 Karl Shale - all instruments and voices
 Gary Dwyer - drums

References

1986 debut EPs
The Colourfield albums
Albums produced by Ian Broudie
Albums produced by Hugh Jones (producer)
Chrysalis Records EPs